Mark Dale Lowery (born March 28, 1957) is an American politician. He serves as the Treasurer of Arkansas following the 2022 election. He previously served as a Republican member for the 39th district of the Arkansas House of Representatives.

Lowery has a Master's degree from the University of Arkansas. In 2013, Lowery was elected for the 39th district of the Arkansas House of Representatives. He assumed office on January 14, 2013.

References 

|-

 

 

1957 births
21st-century American politicians
Living people
Republican Party members of the Arkansas House of Representatives
State treasurers of Arkansas
University of Arkansas alumni